Žarko Rakočević (born January 4, 1984) is a Montenegrin professional basketball player for Étoile de Charleville-Mézières of the French Nationale Masculine 2 (NM2). Standing at 2.04 m (6 ft 8 in), he plays at the power forward position.

Professional career 
Rakočević started his career with Budućnost Podgorica. In March 2008, he signed with the Ukrainian club Cherkaski Mavpy for the rest of the season. On August 28, 2008, he signed with the Serbian club Partizan Belgrade. In October 2009, he parted ways with Partizan. During November 2009, he played with Gorštak Kolašin. On December 11, 2009, he signed with Bosna for the rest of the season.

On July 15, 2010, he signed with Igokea for the 2010–11 season.

On September 26, 2011, he signed with the Austrian club BC Vienna. On December 12, 2011, he left Vienna and signed a one-month contract with the Spanish club Valencia. On January 13, 2012, he parted ways with the club following the expiration of his contract. On January 24, 2012, he signed with Lugano Tigers of the Swiss League for the rest of the season.

On August 24, 2012, he returned to Zepter Vienna. On February 6, 2013, he parted ways with Vienna. On July 2, 2013, he signed a one-year contract with the Hungarian club Körmend. In August 2014, he signed with Al Muharraq in Bahrain.

On December 16, 2014, he signed with the Bulgarian club Rilski Sportist for the rest of the season. On July 8, 2015, he signed with Hungarian club Atomerőmű SE. On January 5, 2016, he signed with Kumanovo of the Macedonian League. On March 9, 2016, he parted ways with Kumanovo.

On August 10, 2016, he signed with French club BC Orchies.

References

External links

 Žarko Rakočević at aba-liga.com
 Žarko Rakočević at acb.com
 Žarko Rakočević at eurobasket.com
 Žarko Rakočević at fiba.com

1984 births
Living people
ABA League players
Atomerőmű SE players
Basketball League of Serbia players
BC Cherkaski Mavpy players
BC Körmend players
BC Rilski Sportist players
BC Zepter Vienna players
KK Budućnost players
KK Igokea players
KK Partizan players
Lugano Tigers players
Montenegrin expatriate basketball people in Serbia
Montenegrin men's basketball players
People from Kolašin
Power forwards (basketball)
Valencia Basket players